Moosajee Bhamjee (born 4 December 1947) is a former Irish Labour Party politician who served as a Teachta Dála (TD) for the Clare constituency from 1992 to 1997. Bhamjee was Ireland's first Muslim TD.

Early life and education 
Bhamjee was born in Pietermaritzburg, South Africa, in 1947. His father emigrated from India in 1906 and had set up a hardware shop there. He father died in 1964, so it was decided that one of the sons would take over the shop while another would go for further education. Bhamjee travelled to Dublin in 1965, where he studied medicine at the Royal College of Surgeons in Ireland.

Bhamjee's two other brothers also travelled to Dublin around the same time to study medicine. After he received his degree, Bhamjee returned to South Africa, where he began working as a general practitioner. He returned to Ireland in 1975 and married a girl he first met when studying in Dublin. They moved to Galway and later to Cork, where he trained as a psychiatrist. In 1984, Bhamjee started a permanent post at Our Lady's Hospital in Ennis, County Clare, less than 20 miles from his wife's home-place of Cooraclare.

Political career and aftermath 
Bhamjee joined the Labour Party in 1991 and was the party's candidate at the 1992 general election. Bhamjee became a TD for Clare, traditionally a Fianna Fáil stronghold. He was in fact the last candidate to become a member of the 27th Dáil. Bhamjee, due to his Indian heritage, was immediately nicknamed "the Indian among the cowboys". While the Labour Party formed a coalition government with Fianna Fáil, Bhamjee was a backbencher. He still worked as a consultant psychiatrist while he was a TD. He declined to stand again at the 1997 general election and retired from politics to continue his career in the health service.

In December 2011, Bhamjee called for the addition of the drug Lithium to the Irish drinking water supply. Bhamjee stated that "there is growing scientific evidence that adding trace amounts of the drug lithium to a water supply can lower rates of suicide and depression".

References

External links
Interview in Psychiatric Bulletin

1947 births
Living people
Labour Party (Ireland) TDs
South African emigrants to Ireland
Irish people of Indian descent
Irish psychiatrists
Members of the 27th Dáil
Irish Muslims
People from Pietermaritzburg
South African people of Indian descent
Politicians from County Clare